Joseph Brook Gunson (March 23, 1863 – November 15, 1942) was a Major League Baseball catcher between  and .

Biography
Born in Philadelphia, Gunson played for the Cleveland Spiders, Washington Nationals, Kansas City Cowboys, Baltimore Orioles, and St. Louis Browns from 1884 to 1893. He is sometimes credited with creating the first catcher's mitt when he was trying to play through an 1888 finger injury. Though Gunson was young and did not need the money, Jim Manning was going to help him patent it once Manning returned from a summer baseball tour. Gunson said that he told some other players about the glove and that many other players began using such a mitt before Manning came home.

Gunson died at his Philadelphia home in 1942.

References

External links

1863 births
1942 deaths
Major League Baseball catchers
Cleveland Spiders players
Kansas City Cowboys players
Washington Nationals (UA) players
Baltimore Orioles (NL) players
St. Louis Browns (AA) players
19th-century baseball players
Meriden Maroons players
Rochester Maroons players
Atlanta Atlantas players
Hartford Dark Blues (minor league) players
Topeka Golden Giants players
Kansas City Blues (baseball) players
Erie Blackbirds players
Springfield Maroons players
Springfield Ponies players
Scranton Miners players
Scranton Red Sox players
Rochester Patriots players
Ottawa Wanderers players
Newark Colts players
Philadelphia Athletics (minor league) players
Harrisburg Ponies players
Baseball players from Pennsylvania